Joffre Daran (27 December 1914 – 27 March 2008) was a French racing cyclist. He rode in the 1939 Tour de France.

He was born in Pavie.

References

External links
 

1914 births
2008 deaths
French male cyclists
Place of birth missing